is a Japanese manga series written and illustrated by Peko Watanabe. It was serialized in Kodansha's seinen manga magazine Monthly Morning Two from May 2009 to December 2012.

Publication
Written and illustrated by Peko Watanabe, Niko Tama was serialized in Kodansha's seinen manga magazine Monthly Morning Two from May 22, 2009, to December 22, 2012. Kodansha collected its chapters in five tankōbon volumes, released from January 22, 2010, to April 23, 2013.

The manga was licensed in France by Kana.

Volume list

See also
1122: For a Happy Marriage—another manga series by the same author.

References

External links
 

Kodansha manga
Seinen manga